Simon, Simon is a 1970 Sound effect comedy short film directed by Graham Stark and starring Graham Stark, Norman Rossington, John Junkin, and Julia Foster.

Synopsis
Two handymen (Graham Stark and John Junkin) cause chaos on a new crane while haphazardly trying to accomplish jobs for their ever more frustrated boss. This 'silent' comedy features a host of cameos from the likes of Peter Sellers, Michael Caine, Bob Monkhouse, Eric Morecambe, Ernie Wise and Tony Blackburn.

The title comes from the Simon hydraulic platforms used in the film.

Cast
Graham Stark
John Junkin
Julia Foster
Norman Rossington
Paul Whitsun-Jones
Audrey Nicholson
Kenneth Earle
Tommy Godfrey

With Tony Blackburn, Michael Caine, David Hemmings, Bob Monkhouse, Eric Morecambe, Pete Murray, Peter Sellers, Bernie Winters and Ernie Wise

External links

1970 films
1970 comedy films
Morecambe and Wise
1970 short films
British comedy short films
1970s English-language films
1970s British films